Terry Duerod (July 29, 1956 – November 13, 2020) was an American professional basketball player.

Amateur career
A 6'2" guard out of Highland Park Community High School in the Detroit area, Duerod played college basketball under Dick Vitale at the University of Detroit.  

Boyd established himself quickly with a Detroit program that would produce an unprecedented run during his time with the Titans (1975-1979).  Vitale added future NBA players such as John Long, Terry Tyler and Dennis Boyd and built a dominating independent program at the Jesuit university.  Duerod played shooting guard for the team, averaged 23.3 ppg on a .525 shooting percentage as a senior.  UD advanced to the 1977 NCAA Division I Basketball Tournament defeating Middle Tennessee in the first round before losing to Michigan in the Sweet 16 86-81 to end a stellar season, finishing #12 in the polls.  

The team was left out of the NCAA in Duerod's junior year, 1977-78, playing in the 1978 NIT, despite a 25-4 record and a #18 ranking, but would return to the 1979 NCAA Division I Basketball Tournament, with Duerod and future NBA center Earl Cureton leading the Titans.  Detroit lost to Lamar 95-87 in the first round.  Detroit finished ranked #20 on the season.  In four seasons at Detroit, Duerod scored 1,690 points, sixth in school history, and was inducted into the Detroit Mercy Titans Hall of Fame in 1993.

Professional career
When Vitale accepted the coaching job with the NBA's Detroit Pistons in 1979, the Pistons selected Duerod in the third round of the 1979 NBA draft. Duerod averaged 9.3 points per game during his rookie season in the NBA, shooting 47 percent from the field.  After the Pistons replaced Vitale with Richie Adubato, however, Duerod was left unprotected in the 1980 NBA Expansion Draft, where he was selected by the Dallas Mavericks.  During his time with the Pistons, Terry would play alongside University of Detroit teammates Tyler and Long.

Duerod played only eighteen games for Dallas before being waived.  He was then signed by the Boston Celtics, with whom he would become a fan favorite as the team's twelfth man.  Celtics fans often chanted "Doooo!" whenever Duerod entered games, and he became a frequent subject of discussion among the Celtics' television and radio announcers.  Duerod earned a championship ring when the Celtics won the 1981 NBA Finals over the Houston Rockets.  On the Celtics fans, Duerod said "Best fans in the world.  Period.  They treat the players great, and support the team no matter what the record is.  It was a super experience for me to play in front of them!"  

Duerod played part of one more season with the Celtics, then played five games for the Golden State Warriors during the 1982–83 season. In his NBA career, he averaged 6.7 points per game.  He was inducted into the University of Detroit Mercy Titans Hall of Fame in 1993.

Later life
Duerod served as a Detroit firefighter for 27 years. The majority of his career was spent as an FEO (Fire Engine Operator). Duerod also played on the fire department's basketball team. He retired because of the department's mandatory retirement policy. Duerod died on November 13, 2020 in Westland, Michigan after suffering from leukemia. He was 64 years old.  Former teammate Cureton said, “He did so many things in his life, made so many great transitions.  Not just in basketball, but being a husband, being a friend, being a firefighter and everything he did, he excelled at. That is the only way I can sum him up, he was a one-of-a-kind guy.”  Duerod was survived by his wife Rosemary.

References

External links
Career statistics
Interview with Terry Duerod
Detroit Mercy Hall of Fame

1956 births
2020 deaths
American expatriate basketball people in Italy
American expatriate basketball people in the Philippines
American firefighters
American men's basketball players
Barangay Ginebra San Miguel players
Basketball players from Michigan
Boston Celtics players
Dallas Mavericks expansion draft picks
Dallas Mavericks players
Deaths from cancer in Michigan
Deaths from leukemia
Detroit Mercy Titans men's basketball players
Detroit Pistons draft picks
Detroit Pistons players
Detroit Spirits players
Golden State Warriors players
Philippine Basketball Association imports
Point guards
Shooting guards
Sportspeople from Royal Oak, Michigan
Victoria Libertas Pallacanestro players